Judge Orrick may refer to:

William H. Orrick Jr. (1915–2003), judge of the United States District Court for the Northern District of California
William Orrick III (born 1953), judge of the United States District Court for the Northern District of California